The Pakistan Federation of Roller Sports is a national sports governing body to develop and promote the sport of roller skating in Pakistan. The federation is based in Lahore founded by Khalid Saeed.

Roller Hockey was first introduced in Pakistan nearly 40 years ago by Mr. Khalid Saeed, who was the President of the Roller Skating Federation of Pakistan. Sadly Khalid Saeed passed away on July 22, 2022 in Lahore, Pakistan leaving behind a son who is currently the General Secretary of the Federation. The first National Championship organized by PFRH was for Rink Hockey (Ball and Cane) in 1980, hosted by Lahore, Pakistan. At the insistence of its growing number of member nations.

The Pakistan Federation of Roller Skating is the national sports governing body to develop and promote roller hockey in Pakistan. The federation is based in Lahore is also affiliated with the International Federation of Roller Sports and its continental association Confederation of Asia Roller Sports.

Pakistan Federation of Roller Hockey has represented Pakistan many times in different countries & different championships as like Olympics, World Games, World Championship, Asian championship, etc.

The federation is affiliated with International Federation of Roller Sports and its continental association Confederation of Asia Roller Sports.

References

Sports governing bodies in Pakistan
Roller skating organizations